Empire I: World Builders is a 1981 video game published by Edu-Ware Services Inc. It is the first game in the Empire trilogy, followed by Empire II: Interstellar Sharks (1982) and Empire III: Armageddon (1983).

Gameplay

Set during the initial colonization period of a galactic Imperial civilization, the player chooses one of three classes (miner, missionary, or homesteader) and departs from the New York city spaceport to practice their chosen trade on the newly colonized planets.

Reception
Rudy Kraft reviewed Empire I: World Builders in The Space Gamer No. 51. Kraft commented that "I cannot recommend buying the game. The general system is interesting, and another game with fewer flaws would be a top-notch product, but World Builders is not."

References

External links
 
Softalk review
Review in Electronic Games

1981 video games
Apple II games
Apple II-only games
Edu-Ware games
Role-playing video games
Science fiction video games
Video games developed in the United States